General elections were scheduled to be held in South Sudan by 9 July 2015, the first since independence. However, in light of an alleged coup d'état attempt and continuing conflict in the country this has been thrown into doubt, especially since no permanent constitution has been formulated. The South Sudan parliament voted in April 2015  to amend the country's transitional 2011 constitution to extend the presidential and parliamentary term until 9 July 2018, with 264 members in favour and a handful opposing it. It was postponed again to 2021 in July 2018. Following the peace agreement that ended the civil war, a transitional period of three years was agreed on, which would be followed by elections in 2023. In 2022, the transitional government and opposition agreed to move it to late 2024.

Background
Following the independence of South Sudan, Riek Machar was inaugurated as the first vice president to President Salva Kiir. In July 2013, the entire cabinet, including Machar, was dismissed by Kiir on the ostensible reason to decrease the size of government. However, Machar said that this was a step towards dictatorship on the part of Kiir and that he would seek to challenge Kiir for the presidency. In December 2013 a related coup d'état was put down. While civil war ensued, at the end of September 2014 an IGAD-mediated resolution was agreed upon that would lead to the federalisation of the country's governance.

The transitional constitution required the election to be held by 9 July 2015, the date on which the first post-independence presidential term ends. Kiir told the Warrap parliament that a lack of funds to conduct a census and complete the new constitution could result in a delay of the election. This caused doubts as to Kiir's intention to merely hold on to power and was coupled with the dismissal of the Governor of Unity Taban Deng Gai on allegation that he would back Machar in replacing Kiir as the SPLM chairperson and therefore the party’s candidate for the election, though Gai denied this. Since the coup, John Garang's son also mentioned that as the constitutional convention could not write a permanent constitution of South Sudan, the scheduled 2015 date for the election would not be met.

Additionally, the U.S. envoy for Sudan and South Sudan, Donald Booth, held talks with the chairperson of the National Elections Commission, Abednego Akok Kacuol, and the chairperson of the National Bureau of Statistics, Isaiah Chol Aruai, in order to call for sticking to the allotted date and the provision of funds to complete the necessary prerequisites.

The South Sudan parliament voted in April 2015 to amend the country's transitional 2011 constitution to extend the presidential and parliamentary term until 9 July 2018.

Presidential candidates

Announced
SPLM
Suzanne Jambo, the party's Secretary for Foreign Relation's Affairs
Kush Democratic Majority Party
Bol Gai Deng

References

South Sudan
2024 in South Sudan
Elections in South Sudan